Axiom of choice is an axiom of set theory.

Axiom of choice may also refer to:

Axiom of Choice (band), a world music group of Iranian émigrés

See also
Axiom of countable choice
Axiom of dependent choice
Axiom of global choice
Axiom of non-choice
Axiom of finite choice
Luce's choice axiom